(also credited as Carol Yas) is a Japanese video game designer. He is best known for designing the gameplay and stages of the initial Sonic the Hedgehog video games for Sega Genesis in the 1990s, based on technical demos and engines programmed by Yuji Naka. Yasuhara stayed with Sega until the late 1990s. He then joined Naughty Dog, working on the Jak and Daxter series and Uncharted: Drake's Fortune, collaborating again with former Sega employee Mark Cerny. He was the senior design director at Namco Bandai Games America. In April 2012, Yasuhara joined Nintendo where he accepted a position at the Nintendo Software Technology division. He has since worked for Unity Technologies.

Production history
 Altered Beast (1988) – Game planner
 Fatal Labyrinth (1990) – Game planner
 Pyramid Magic (1991) – Special thanks
 Pyramid Magic Special (1991) – Special thanks
 Sonic the Hedgehog (1991) – Lead game designer, Game planner
 Sonic the Hedgehog 2 (1992) – Lead game designer, Game planner
 Sonic Spinball (1993) – Special thanks
 Sonic the Hedgehog 3 (1994) – Director, lead game designer
 Sonic & Knuckles (1994) – Director, lead game designer
 Sonic 3 & Knuckles (1994) – Director, lead game designer
 Sonic 3D Blast (1996) – Playfield design, Special thanks
 Sonic R (1997) – Map design director
 Sega Smash Pack 2 (2000) – Special thanks
 Floigan Bros. (2001) – Game designer
 Jak II (2003) – Game designer
 Jak 3 (2004) – Game designer
 Jak X: Combat Racing (2005) – Game designer
 Uncharted: Drake's Fortune (2007) – Game designer
 Afro Samurai (2009) – Special thanks
 Mario and Donkey Kong: Minis on the Move (2013) – Game designer
 Super Smash Bros. for Nintendo 3DS and Wii U (2014) – Special thanks
 Mario vs. Donkey Kong: Tipping Stars (2015) – Special thanks
 Mini Mario & Friends: Amiibo Challenge (2016) – Special thanks
 Sonic Mania (2017) – Special thanks
 Sonic Forces (2017) – Special thanks
 Team Sonic Racing (2019) – Special thanks
 Sonic Frontiers (2022) – Special thanks

References

Living people
Japanese video game designers
1965 births
Nintendo people
Sega people
Naughty Dog people